Once Upon A Warrior is a 2011 Indian Telugu-language fantasy adventure film written and directed by Prakash Kovelamudi in his first mainstream film. It is produced by Walt Disney Pictures with veteran director K. Raghavendra Rao's A Bellyful of Dreams Entertainment at a budget of  26 crore and stars Siddharth, Shruti Haasan, Baby Harshitha, and Lakshmi Manchu. Once Upon a Warrior focuses on the journey of Moksha (Harshitha), a nine-year-old girl with special healing powers, and Yodha (Siddharth), her fierce warrior bodyguard, as they travel to a faraway village to save its children, under the constant menace of the evil witch Irendri (Manchu).

This film marks the Telugu debuts of Shruti Haasan and Lakshmi Manchu. It features a musical score by Salim–Sulaiman, an ensemble soundtrack by Salim–Sulaiman, M. M. Keeravani, Koti, and Mickey J Meyer, while cinematography and editing are handled by Soundar Rajan and Sravan Katikaneni, respectively.

Plot
Irendri (Lakshmi Manchu) is a sorceress who terrorizes people of Anga Rajyam. A guru arrests her, doesn't allow her to play with the lives of people, and destroys her. Before she was destroyed, Irendri takes her soul away and traps it in a locket. Though she dies, her soul lives in the locket. Her great-great-granddaughter is Priya (Shruthi Haasan), and she lives as a gypsy.

Priya too possesses magical powers as she was born into a sorceress' family. Yodha (Siddharth) is a travelling swordsman who always romances women whenever there is opportunity. He is smitten by Priya's beauty and falls in love with her. Sudigundam (Ravi Babu) is a local goon, and he attacks the gypsies' village. Yodha prevents him and defeats him in a fight. However, Sudigundam makes a stealth attack, ties Yodha's hands, and sets afire the entire village.

In this process, the locket in Priya's neck falls down, and Irendri's soul comes out with the touch of fire. The sarpa sakthi (power of the serpents) tells her that she could gain power with a drop of Priya's blood. So, Irendri takes away Priya and imprisons her. Meanwhile, Yodha turns blind as Sudigundam pierces his eyes. However, Yodha gets saved by a swami (Subbaraya Sarma) and appoints to save a girl named Moksha (Baby Harshitha), who has divine powers. Irendri, to take revenge, attacks Agartha, a village in Anga Rashtram, and makes the children of the village senseless.

Druki (Vallabhaneni Ramji) goes to Pushpagiri to bring Moksha, who could save their children. Druki, Yodha, and Moksha start from Pushpagiri and reach Agartha. At this juncture, the sarpa sakti tells Irendri that Moksha's blood would make her invincible if it was taken by her on lunar eclipse day. So, Irendri sends her men to capture Moksha. But Yodha kills all of them. Irendri again sends Sudigundam, the commander-in-chief, to bring her. Yodha follows them in search of Moksha, finds Priya alive, and saves Moksha and Priya. Moksha brings back Yodha's vision with her divine power. Yodha decides to completely destroy Irendri as she is trying to harm people and succeeds in the climax.

Cast

 Siddharth as Yodha
 Shruti Haasan as Priya
 Lakshmi Manchu as Irendri
 Subbaraya Sharma as Lama
 Baby Harshitha as Moksha
 Ravi Babu as Sudigundam
 Brahmanandam as Jaffa
 Ali as Jilebi
 Vallabhaneni Ramji as Druki
 Tanikella Bharani as Kakshira
 Hari Teja as Chitra
 Sudarshan as Gundu
 Subba Raju as Dhanaiah
 Ananth as Kulfi
 Gunjan Bakshi as Manju

Production
Pre-production for Once Upon a Warrior began in June 2009 and the cast was finalized soon after, with the film creating expectations as it marked the debuts of noted star children Prakash Kovelamudi, Shruti Haasan, and Lakshmi Manchu. Furthermore, the film marked a return to a rare genre in Indian cinema: the fantasy adventure. Shooting began in October 2009 and took place across India, whilst scenes were also shot in Turkey.

During the production stage, Disney agreed to co-produce with Raghavendra Rao's home banner, a Bellyful of Dreams Entertainment, marking the first South Indian production by Disney.

Release
Once Upon a Warrior was released internationally on 14 January 2011 during the Sankranti festival to average reviews and box office collections.

Dubbed versions were created in Tamil and Malayalam, but their release was put on hold indefinitely due to the unexpected failure of the Telugu version. The film is rated PG-13 in North America for "violence and scary images" making it the sixth of ten Disney-branded films to receive the rating.

Home media
The film was released by Buena Vista Home Entertainment on DVD and digital download on 26 July 2011. The release will be produced in DVD widescreen and include a Telugu language track plus English subtitles.

Reception
Radhika Rajamani of Rediff.com rated the film 3/5, calling it a "visual extravaganza." While praising the technical aspects of the film like photography, the art direction, the editing, and the computer generated imagery (CGI), she felt that the story had a few loopholes. A reviewer from Sify also rated the same and said: "The film opens on a grand scale, as though it is going to set the standards for a fantasy film, but within a few minutes, the tempo dies, dragging the film into a monotonous drama, making the audiences wait in expectation for something to happen. Frame after frame, the curiosity dies."

Awards
Nandi Awards
 2011 - Nandi Award for Best Villain - Lakshmi Manchu
 2011 - Nandi Award for Best Special Effects - Phani Eggone

CineMAA Awards
 2012 - CineMAA Award for Best Female Debut - Shruti Haasan
 2012 - CineMAA Award for Best Supporting Actress - Lakshmi Manchu

Filmfare Awards South
 2012 - Filmfare Award for Best Female Debut – South - Shruti Haasan

Other awards
 Hyderabad Times Film Award for Best Actor in a Negative Role (Female) - Lakshmi Manchu.
 2012 - SIIMA Award for Best Female Debut (Telugu) - Shruti Haasan

Soundtrack

References

External links
 
 

2011 films
2010s fantasy adventure films
2010s musical fantasy films
Indian films with live action and animation
Indian fantasy adventure films
2010s Telugu-language films
Films scored by M. M. Keeravani
Indian musical fantasy films
Films scored by Mickey J Meyer
Films scored by Koti
Disney India films
2011 directorial debut films
Films directed by Prakash Kovelamudi